The Golden Triangle Festival was a golf tournament on the LPGA Tour, played only in 1959. It was played at the PGA National Golf Club in Dunedin, Florida. Beverly Hanson won the event.

References

Former LPGA Tour events
Golf in Florida
Women's sports in Florida